Paulo Alexandre Faria Rocha (born ), known as Paulinho Rocha, is a Portuguese futsal player who is a universal player for Portimonense and the Portugal national team.

References

External links

Paulinho Rocha at playmakerstats.com (formerly thefinalball.com)

1990 births
Living people
Portuguese men's futsal players
AR Freixieiro players
S.L. Benfica futsal players